Toralf Arndt, also known as Thoralf Arndt (born 8 November 1966) is a former professional German footballer.

Arndt made 23 appearances in the 2. Bundesliga for FC Rot-Weiß Erfurt during his playing career.

References

External links 
 

1966 births
Living people
German footballers
East German footballers
Association football forwards
2. Bundesliga players
Berliner FC Dynamo players
FC Rot-Weiß Erfurt players
Tennis Borussia Berlin players
Füchse Berlin Reinickendorf players
DDR-Oberliga players